George Jarvis (24 June 1800 – 27 March 1880) was an English cricketer who played first-class cricket from 1826 to 1841.  He was a brother of Charles Jarvis. 

Jarvis was a right-handed batsman and an underarm fast bowler.  He played mainly for Nottingham Cricket Club and Nottinghamshire and made 37 known first-class appearances.  He represented the Players in the Gentlemen v Players series and played four times for North v. South from 1836 to 1838.

Jarvis scored 814 runs at an average of 12.71, with a highest score of 59.  He took 13 catches and bowled 72 recorded deliveries, taking nine wickets and conceding sixteen runs.

References

1800 births
1880 deaths
English cricketers
English cricketers of 1826 to 1863
Nottinghamshire cricketers
North v South cricketers
Players cricketers
Cricketers from Nottingham
Nottingham Cricket Club cricketers